Zoarvlei Wetlands is a wetland reserve of about  in the city of Cape Town, South Africa. It forms part of the larger Table Bay Nature Reserve proclaimed in June 2012.

It protects diverse bird life, including a variety of water birds and gulls. The wetland is covered in reeds, with some open water. The dry land preserves a range of spring and annual flowers. 
The reserve is located next to the suburb of Paarden Eiland, close to the city centre.

See also
 Table Bay Nature Reserve
 Biodiversity of Cape Town
 List of nature reserves in Cape Town
 Cape Lowland Freshwater Wetland

References

 
Nature reserves in Cape Town
Protected areas of the Western Cape
Wetlands of South Africa